Gerard Murphy may refer to:
 Gerard Murphy (politician) (born 1951), Irish Fine Gael politician, TD for Cork North West
 Gerard Murphy (mathematician) (1948–2006), Irish mathematics professor
 Gerard Murphy (actor) (1948–2013), Irish film, television and theatre actor

See also
 Gerry Murphy (disambiguation)